Kim W. Andersson is a Swedish comic book writer and artist. His works include Love Hurts and Alena, the latter of which was adapted into a Swedish film of the same name. He was the 2011 winner of the Swedish Comics Academy's Adamson statue, Sweden's most prestigious comics award.

Bibliography
 Love Hurts (2009)
 Alena (2012)
 Astrid: Cult of the Volcanic Moon (2016)

Filmography
 Alena (2015)

References

External links

Swedish comics artists
Swedish comics writers